Eiji Tsuburaya (1901–1970) was a Japanese special effects director and cinematographer.

Tsuburaya may also refer to:
 Hajime Tsuburaya, Japanese film director, producer, and cinematographer
 Noboru Tsuburaya, Japanese film producer
 Akira Tsuburaya, Japanese film producer
 Hiroshi Tsuburaya, Japanese actor, a grandchild of Eiji Tsuburaya
 Kazuo Tsuburaya, Japanese film producer, a grandchild of Eiji Tsuburaya
 Yūko Tsuburaya, Japanese actress, a grandchild of Eiji Tsuburaya
 Kōkichi Tsuburaya, Japanese athlete
 Tsuburaya Productions, a Japanese special effects studio founded by Eiji Tsuburaya

Japanese-language surnames